Rhinostomus barbirostris, common name Bottlebrush Weevil or Bearded Weevil,  is a species of true weevil family.

Description
It is probably the third largest weevil in the world. The basic color is black. The pronotum is as long as wide and densely punctate. The elytra bear distinct striae and are deeply punctate. Males have characteristic long reddish gold hairs on the apical portion of the long, straight, and dorsally dentate rostrum. The antennae are long and slender, and strongly elbowed. The front tibiae have two or more large, sharp teeth on the inner face. This species shows an unusual sexual polymorphism, as some males in each population are smaller than other males and resemble females.

Distribution 
This common and widespread species occurs mainly in Central America and South America, while similar species in the genus occur in the United States, Africa, Madagascar, Borneo, and India.

References 

 Gwannon
 Patricia Vaurie    Weevils of the Tribe Sipalini (Coleoptera, Curculionidae, Rhynchophorinae) Part 1. The Genera Rhinostomus and Yuccaborus
 Key to species of Rhinostomus
 The smaller majority
  Morrone, J.J., Cuevas, P.I. (2002) Cladistics of the pantropical genus Rhinostomus (Coleoptera: Curculionoidea: Dryophthoridae) with nomenclatural notes

Dryophthorinae
Beetles of Central America
Beetles described in 1775
Taxa named by Johan Christian Fabricius